Rocky Beach may refer to:

 An old name for Gilchrist Beach
 A fictitious town in the book series The Three Investigators
 A fictitious town in a detective book called Tin Goyenda